Dianne Reeves is a studio album by American jazz singer Dianne Reeves issued in 1987 on Blue Note Records. The album peaked at number 1 on the US Billboard Contemporary Jazz Albums chart and at number 28 on the US Billboard Top R&B/Hip-Hop Albums chart.

Overview
The album was produced by George Duke and recorded at Mama Jo's and Le Gonks West in Hollywood, California. Dianne Reeves also spent six weeks at No. 1 on the Contemporary Jazz Albums chart.

Track listing

Personnel
Dianne Elizabeth Reeves – vocals
George Duke – Synclavier synthesizer (tracks: 1-3), Yamaha TX816 (tracks: 1, 3), piano (track 7), producer
William Edward Childs – piano (tracks: 2, 6, 8)
Herbert Jeffrey Hancock – keyboards (tracks: 4, 5)
Jorge Luis Gutierret Del Barrio – synthesizer (tracks: 4, 5)
Paul Milton Jackson, Jr. – guitar (tracks: 1, 3-5)
Fred Douglas Washington Jr. – bass (tracks: 1, 3-5)
Tony Dumas – bass (tracks: 2, 8)
Stanley Clarke – bass (tracks: 6, 7)
Richard David Lawson – drums (tracks: 1, 3)
Ralph Penland – drums (tracks: 2, 8)
Leon "Ndugu" Chancler – drums (tracks: 4, 5)
Anthony Tillmon Williams – drums (tracks: 6, 7)
Paulo Roberto da Costa – percussion (tracks: 1, 3-5)
Airto Moreira – percussion (track 6)
Justo Almario – tenor saxophone (track 4)
Freddie Hubbard – flugelhorn (tracks: 6, 7)
Erik Zobler – engineering
Alice Murrell – assistant producer
Steven Bradley Ford – assistant engineering (tracks: 1-5, 8)
Mitch Gibson – assistant engineering (tracks: 1, 3-7)
Michael R. Morris – management

Chart history

References

External links 

 

1987 albums
Dianne Reeves albums
Blue Note Records albums
Albums produced by George Duke